Per-Olof "Posa" Serenius (born 9 March 1948) in Hedemora, Sweden, is a Swedish former ice speedway rider. He is notable for winning two World Individual Championship gold medals in ice speedway.

Biography
Serenius was a fireman by profession. Already an experienced motorcyclist, he began to compete in ice speedway racing in 1976 after witnessing a World Championship ice speedway competition in Berlin. His career racing record includes two World Individual Championship gold medals, three World Team gold medals, 32 World finals, 22 national championships and eight Nordic Championships. He participated in the documentary film Icy Riders from 2008. In 2016, Serenius was named an FIM Legend for his motorcycle racing achievements.

World final appearances

Ice World Championship
1978  Assen, 13th
1979  Inzell, 8th 
1980  Kalinin, 15th
1981  Assen, 13th
1982  Inzell, 2nd
1983  Eindhoven, 9th 
1984  Moscow, 10th 
1985  Assen, 10th
1986  Stockholm, 7th
1987  Berlin, 11th
1988  Eindhoven, 8th
1989  Almaty, 6th
1990  Göteborg, 4th
1991  Assen, 2nd
1992  Frankfurt, 5th
1993  Saransk, 6th
1994 10 Rounds GP, 2nd
1995 10 Rounds GP, Champion
1996 10 Rounds GP, 6th
1997  Assen, 6th
1998 10 Rounds GP, 5th
1999 10 Rounds GP, 10th
2000  Assen, 11th
2001 8 Rounds GP, 11th
2002 8 Rounds GP, Champion
2003 6 Rounds GP, 9th
2004 8 Rounds GP, 9th
2005 6 Rounds GP, 11th
2006 4 Rounds GP, 12th
2007 6 Rounds GP, 17th
2008 6 Rounds GP, 10th

References

1954 births
People from Hedemora Municipality
Swedish motorcycle racers
Ice speedway
Living people
Ice Speedway World Champions
Sportspeople from Dalarna County